The 1500 metres speed skating event was part of the speed skating at the 1932 Winter Olympics programme. The competition was held on Friday, February 5, 1932. Eighteen speed skaters from six nations competed. Like all other speed skating events at this Olympics the competition was held for the only time in pack-style format, having all competitors skate at the same time.

Medalists

Records
These were the standing world and Olympic records (in minutes) prior to the 1932 Winter Olympics.

(*) The record was set in a high altitude venue (more than 1000 metres above sea level) and on naturally frozen ice.

Results

First round

Heat 1

Heat 2

In the middle of the heat, the judges suddenly stopped the race. They accused the skaters of 'loafing' and ordered the race rerun.

Heat 3

Final

References

External links
Official Olympic Report
 

Men's speed skating at the 1932 Winter Olympics